Auguste Linstant de Pradines, also known as August de Pradines, Ti Candio or Kandjo (10 September 1879 – October 1947) was an influential Haitian musician who largely created the archetype of the Haitian troubadour. 
Over nearly five decades, de Pradines composed love songs as well as songs of political and social commentary, traveling throughout Haiti to perform in clubs, at private parties, in theaters, and outdoor rallies.
de Pradines had twelve children, including his daughter Emerante de Pradines Morse who also became a prominent Haitian musician, as did her son, Richard Auguste Morse, and another of Auguste de Pradines' grandsons, Michel Martelly, who also served as president of Haiti (2011-2016).

Early & personal life

Auguste Linstant de Pradines was born in Paris, France on 10 September 1879.
He was the son of prominent Haitian lawyer Linstant de Pradines. 
At 9 years of age, while living in France with his father, Auguste was diagnosed with
polio. Physicians recommended that he return to Haiti, where Auguste was homeschooled.
Five years later, at the age of 14, when due to his polio Auguste had no control over the left part of his body, he was "carried on his back" to

In 1897, Averill wrote that this song, Erzulie, "became one of his [de Pradines'] most beloved compositions and a part of the Haitian folkloric repertory up to the present day."

Auguste's schooling included a "strong course of music", and he became proficient on piano, guitar, mandolin, and other instruments.
By age 19 Auguste, who became professionally known as Kandjo, had devoted himself to a musical career. In 1903, he was chosen to sing the premier of the Haitian national anthem, La Dessalinienne.

de Pradines married Amarante Jean Pierre, who was of Haitian and Spanish descent.
Together they had twelve children, nine of whom survived past an early age. Their daughter, Emerante de Pradines Morse, also became a prominent Haitian musician, as did her son, Richard Auguste Morse, and another grandson, Michel Martelly, who also served as president of Haiti (2011-2016).

Musical career
Beginning in the 1890s, Kandjo was a prolific composer of up to four songs per week. Nearly all of Kandjo's songs were written in Haitian Kreyòl (Creole). Over nearly five decades, he composed love songs, as well as satirical songs and songs of political and social commentary. He would travel throughout Haiti to perform. In Port-au-Prince as well as throughout Haitian provinces, Kandjo "was in great demand as a singer before, during, and after the [1915-1934 US] occupation in clubs, at private parties, in theaters, and eventually at outdoor rallies".
Kandjo

Kandjo, "like many urban, educated Haitians", had a mixed reaction to the occupation of Haiti by the United States (1915-1934). Initially he believed that outside intervention was needed to address internecine Haitian strife, and Kandjo's songs of the early occupation period were "reflective and philosophical."
However, over time, Kandjo became disillusioned by US abuses,such as the "exploitive economic treaty and... harsh American tactics during the strike at the agronomy school and in other crises. 
Kandjo opposed these abuses, and became "remembered as an artist who opposed the occupation in its latter years. In his home city of Port-au-Prince and throughout the provinces, he was in great demand as a singer before, during, and after the occupation in clubs, at private parties, in theaters, and eventually at outdoor rallies."
Kandjo wrote satirical songs and in other ways participated in the campaign to unseat Louis Borno, president of Haiti from 1922 to 1930. In this struggle, "On may occasions the targets of Kandjo's barbs attempted to intimidate him, including one time in which he had to crawl over an embassy wall to obtain protection."
Yet, as explained by Kandjo's daughter, Emerante Morse,

Works
Well known songs composed by Kandjo include
 "Erzuli nennen O", a song in honor of the Haitian traditional religious deity Erzuli;
 "Dodo Turgeau," also known as “Toutes renmen se renmen", a classic love song;
 "Angelique O," a critique of US imperialist occupation of Haiti (1915 to 1934), and of the government of Haitian President Louis Borno. Yet 'On the final day of the occupation, the Garde d'Haiti, accustomed to marching to "Semper Fidelis" and the "Halls of Montezuma," instead asked their musical corps to play "Angelique O" as the troops marched in front of 10,000 people.'
 "Pa fè m sa" ("Don't do me like that"), based on Damocles Vieux's poem "Choucoune", in which politicians are criticized by name;
 "Sa ki fe sa dous konsa" (What makes this so sweet);
 "Se la raj" (It's all the rage);
 "Qu'est-ce qui frappe à ma porte" (Who's knocking at my door?);
 "Mete fren" (Put on the brakes);

Other compositions include:
 "Senateur King" which "praised an American senator who had opposed the financial treaty imposed on Haiti";
 "Nap pedale" (We're pedaling), an anti-occupation satire;
 "Ou pop repedale" (You're not pedaling again);
 "Merci Papa Vincent", thanking President Vincent who presided over end of occupation;

Death
Auguste died on an unknown day in October 1947, age 68, from unknown causes.

References

External links
 Erzulie O (3:26) rendition by Kandjo's grandson Richard Auguste Morse and his band RAM
 Angelina (3:00) sung by Martha Jean-Claude

1879 births
1947 deaths
20th-century Haitian male singers